Dieter Krause (18 January 1936 – 10 August 2020) was a German sprint canoeist who competed from the late 1950s to the mid-1960s. He won a gold medal in the K-1 4×500 m event at the 1960 Summer Olympics in Rome (with Paul Lange, Günther Perleberg and Friedhelm Wentzke).

Krause also won four medals at the ICF Canoe Sprint World Championships with a gold (K-4 1000 m: 1963), a silver (K-2 1000 m: 1963), and two bronzes (K-1 500 m: 1958, K-1 4×500 m: 1963). He was a Stasi informer under the codename "Reiner Lesser".

References

External links

1936 births
2020 deaths
Canoeists at the 1960 Summer Olympics
German male canoeists
Olympic canoeists of the United Team of Germany
Olympic gold medalists for the United Team of Germany
Olympic medalists in canoeing
ICF Canoe Sprint World Championships medalists in kayak
Medalists at the 1960 Summer Olympics
People of the Stasi
Sportspeople from Brandenburg an der Havel